Richard Hirschfeld Williams (May 7, 1929 – July 7, 2011) was an American left fielder, third baseman, manager, coach and front-office consultant in Major League Baseball. Known especially as a hard-driving, sharp-tongued manager from 1967 to 1969 and from 1971 to 1988, he led teams to three American League pennants, one National League pennant, and two World Series triumphs. He is one of nine managers to win pennants in both major leagues, and joined Bill McKechnie in becoming only the second manager to lead three franchises to the Series. He and Lou Piniella are the only managers in history to lead four teams to seasons of 90 or more wins. Williams was inducted into the National Baseball Hall of Fame in 2008 following his election by the Veterans Committee.

Early life
Williams was born on May 7, 1929, in St. Louis, Missouri, and lived there until age 13, when his family moved to Pasadena, California. He attended Pasadena High School, and then enrolled in Pasadena City College.

Career

Playing career
Williams signed his first professional contract with the Brooklyn Dodgers in 1947, and played his first major league game with Brooklyn in 1951. Initially an outfielder, he separated a shoulder attempting to make a diving catch on August 25, 1952; he missed the rest of the season and permanently weakened his throwing arm. As a result, he learned to play several positions (he was frequently a first baseman and third baseman) and became a notorious "bench jockey" in order to keep his major league job. He appeared in 1,023 games over 13 seasons with the Dodgers, Baltimore Orioles, Cleveland Indians, Kansas City Athletics and Boston Red Sox. Williams posted a career batting average of .260; his 768 hits included 70 home runs, 157 doubles and 12 triples. In the field, he appeared in 456 games in the outfield, 257 at third base, and 188 at first.

He was a favorite of Paul Richards, who acquired Williams four different times between 1956 and 1962 when Richards was a manager or general manager with Baltimore and the Houston Colt .45s. One such transaction occurred on April 12, 1961 when Williams was traded along with Dick Hall from the Athletics to the Orioles for Chuck Essegian and Jerry Walker. He never played for Houston; he was acquired in an off-season "paper transaction" on October 12, 1962, then traded to the Red Sox for another outfielder, Carroll Hardy, on December 10.

His two-year playing career in Boston was uneventful, except for one occasion. On June 27, 1963, Williams was victimized by one of the greatest catches in Fenway Park history. His long drive to the opposite field was snagged by Cleveland right fielder Al Luplow, who made a leaping catch at the wall and tumbled into the bullpen with the ball in his grasp.

Managerial career

An "Impossible Dream" in Boston
On October 14, 1964, after a season during which Williams hit a career-low .159, the Red Sox handed him his unconditional release. At 35, Williams was at a career crossroads: Richards gave him a spring training invitation but no guarantee that he would make the 1965 Astros' playing roster; the Red Sox offered Williams a job as playing coach with their Triple-A farm team, the Seattle Rainiers of the Pacific Coast League. Looking to begin a post-playing career in baseball, Williams accepted the Seattle assignment. Within days, a shuffle in 1965 affiliations forced Boston to move its top minor league team to the Toronto Maple Leafs of the International League. This caused the Red Sox' Triple-A manager, Seattle native Edo Vanni, to resign in order to remain in the Pacific Northwest. With a sudden opening for the Toronto job, Williams was promoted to manager of the 1965 Leafs. As a novice pilot, Williams adopted a hard-nosed, disciplinarian style and won two consecutive Governors' Cup championships with teams laden with young Red Sox prospects. He then signed a one-year contract to manage the 1967 Red Sox.

Boston had suffered through eight straight seasons of losing baseball, and attendance had fallen to such an extent that owner Tom Yawkey was threatening to move the team. The Red Sox had talented young players, but the team was known as a lazy "country club." As Carl Yastrzemski commented, "if you don't keep your nose to the grindstone you won't (win) ... we kept our noses so far away from the grindstone we couldn't even see it."

Williams decided to risk everything and impose discipline on his players. He vowed that "we will win more ballgames than we lose" — a bold statement for a club that had finished only a half-game from last place in 1966. The only team with a worse record than the Red Sox was their arch-rival, the New York Yankees, who were headed in a downward spiral only two years after losing the 1964 World Series to the St. Louis Cardinals in seven games. In spring training, Williams drilled players in fundamentals for hours.  He issued fines for curfew violations, and insisted his players put the success of the team before their own.  In Yastrzemski's words, "Dick Williams didn't take anything when he took over the club last spring ... to the best of my knowledge—and I would know if it had happened—no one challenged Williams all season."

The Red Sox began 1967 playing better baseball and employing the aggressive style of play that Williams had learned with the Dodgers. Williams benched players for lack of effort and poor performance, and battled tooth and nail with umpires. Through the All-Star break, Boston fulfilled Williams' promise and played better than .500 ball, hanging close to the American League's four contending teams — the Detroit Tigers, Minnesota Twins, Chicago White Sox and California Angels. Outfielder Carl Yastrzemski, in his seventh season with the Red Sox, transformed his hitting style to become a pull-hitter, eventually winning the 1967 AL Triple Crown, leading the league in batting average, home runs (tying Harmon Killebrew of the Twins), and RBI.

In late July, the Red Sox rattled off a 10-game winning streak on the road and came home to a riotous welcome from 10,000 fans at Boston's Logan Airport. The Red Sox inserted themselves into a five-team pennant race, and stayed in the hunt despite the loss of star outfielder Tony Conigliaro to a beanball on August 18. On the closing weekend of the season, led by Yastrzemski and 22-game-winning pitcher Jim Lonborg, Boston defeated the Twins in two head-to-head games, while Detroit split its series with the Angels. The "Impossible Dream" Red Sox had won their first AL pennant since 1946, then they extended the highly talented and heavily favored St. Louis Cardinals to seven games in the 1967 World Series, losing to the great Bob Gibson three times.

Despite the Series loss, the Red Sox were the toasts of New England; Williams was named Major League Manager of the Year by The Sporting News and signed to a new three-year contract. But he would not serve it out. In 1968, the team fell to fourth place when Conigliaro could not return from his head injury, and Williams' two top pitchers — Lonborg and José Santiago — suffered sore arms. He began to clash with Yastrzemski, and with owner Yawkey. With his club a distant third in the AL East, Williams was fired on September 23, 1969 and replaced by Eddie Popowski for the last nine games of the season.

Two titles in a row in Oakland

After spending 1970 as the third base coach of the Montreal Expos, working under Gene Mauch, Williams returned to the managerial ranks the next year as boss of the Oakland Athletics, owned by Charlie Finley. The iconoclastic Finley had signed some of the finest talent in baseball – including Catfish Hunter, Reggie Jackson, Sal Bando, Bert Campaneris, Rollie Fingers and Joe Rudi that were described by Finley as the "Swingin' A's" – but his players hated him for his penny-pinching and constant meddling in the team's affairs. During his first decade as the Athletics' owner, 1961–1970, Finley had changed managers a total of ten times.

Inheriting a second-place team from predecessor John McNamara, Williams promptly directed the A's to 101 victories and their first AL West title in 1971 behind another brilliant young player, pitcher Vida Blue. Despite being humbled in the ALCS by the defending World Champion Orioles, Finley brought Williams back for 1972, when the "Oakland Dynasty" began. Off the field, the A's players brawled with each other and defied baseball's tonsorial code. Because long hair, mustaches and beards were now the rage in the "civilian" world, Finley decided on a mid-season promotion encouraging his men to wear their hair long and grow facial hair. Fingers adopted his trademark handlebar mustache (which he still has to this day); Williams himself grew a mustache.

Of course, talent, not hairstyle, truly defined the Oakland Dynasty of the early 1970s. The 1972 A's won their division by 5½ games over the White Sox and led the league in home runs, shutouts and saves. They defeated the Tigers in a bitterly fought ALCS, and found themselves facing the Cincinnati Reds in the World Series. With the A's leading power hitter, Jackson, out with an injury, Cincinnati's Big Red Machine was favored to win, but the home run heroics of Oakland catcher Gene Tenace and the managerial maneuvering of Williams resulted in a seven-game World Series victory for the A's, their first championship since 1930, when they played in Philadelphia.

In 1973, with Williams back for an unprecedented (for the Finley era) third straight campaign, the A's again coasted to a division title, then defeated Baltimore in the ALCS and the NL champion New York Mets in the World Series – each hard-fought series going the limit. With their World Series win, Oakland became baseball's first repeat champion since the 1961–62 New York Yankees. But Williams had a surprise for Finley. Tired of his owner's meddling, and upset by Finley's public humiliation of second baseman Mike Andrews for his fielding miscues during the World Series, Williams resigned. George Steinbrenner, then finishing his first season as owner of the Yankees, immediately signed Williams as his manager. However, Finley protested that Williams owed Oakland the final year of his contract and could not manage anywhere else, and so Steinbrenner hired Bill Virdon instead. Williams was the first manager in A's franchise history to leave the team with a winning record after running it for two full seasons.

From Southern California to Montreal and back

California Angels
Seemingly at the peak of his career, Williams began the 1974 season out of work. But when the Angels struggled under manager Bobby Winkles, team owner Gene Autry received Finley's permission to negotiate with Williams, and in mid-season Williams was back in a big-league dugout. The change in management, though, did not alter the fortunes of the Angels, as they finished in last place, 22 games behind the A's, who would win their third straight World Championship under Williams' replacement, Alvin Dark.

Overall, Williams' Anaheim tenure turned out to be a miserable one.  He did not have nearly as much talent as he'd had to work with in Boston and Oakland, and the Angels did not respond to Williams' somewhat authoritarian managing style.  They finished last in the AL West again in 1975.  During the 1975 season, Boston Red Sox pitcher Bill Lee stated that the Angels' hitters were "so weak, they could hold batting practice in the Boston Sheraton hotel lobby and not hit the chandelier".  Williams responded by having his team actually do so before the game (using Wiffle balls and bats) with the Red Sox until hotel security put a stop to it.    The Angels were 18 games below .500 (and in the midst of a player revolt) in  1976 when Williams was fired July 22.

Montreal Expos
In 1977, he returned to Montreal as manager of the Expos where he remained for 5 years (Williams' longest stint as manager), who had just come off 107 losses and a last-place finish in the NL East. Team president John McHale had been impressed with Williams' efforts in Boston and Oakland, and thought he was what the Expos needed to finally become a winner.

After cajoling the Expos into improved, but below .500, performances in his first two seasons, Williams turned the 1979–80 Expos into pennant contenders. The team won over 90 games both years—the first winning seasons in franchise history.  The 1979 unit won 95 games, the most that the franchise would win in Montreal. However, they finished second each time to the eventual World Champion (the Pittsburgh Pirates in 1979 and the Philadelphia Phillies in 1980). Williams was never afraid to give young players a chance to play, and his Expos teams were flush with young talent, including All-Stars such as outfielder Andre Dawson and catcher Gary Carter.  With a solid core of young players and a fruitful farm system, the Expos seemed a lock to contend for a long time to come.

But Williams' hard edge alienated his players—especially his pitchers—and ultimately wore out his welcome. He labeled pitcher Steve Rogers a fraud with "king of the mountain syndrome" – meaning that Rogers had been a good pitcher on a bad team for so long that he was unable to "step up" when the team became good. Williams also lost confidence in closer Jeff Reardon, whom the Montreal front office had acquired in a much publicized trade with the Mets for Ellis Valentine. When the 1981 Expos performed below expectations, Williams was fired during the pennant drive on September 7. With the arrival of his easy-going successor Jim Fanning, who restored Reardon to the closer's role, the inspired Expos made the playoffs for the only time in their 36-year history in Montreal. However, they fell in heartbreaking fashion to Rick Monday and the eventual World Champion Los Angeles Dodgers in a five-game NLCS.

San Diego Padres
Williams was not unemployed for long, however.  In 1982, he took over the San Diego Padres. By 1984, he had guided the Padres to their first NL West Division championship. In the NLCS, the NL East champion Chicago Cubs – making their first postseason appearance since 1945 – won Games 1 and 2, but Williams' Padres took the next three games in a miraculous comeback to win the pennant. In the World Series, however, San Diego was no match for Sparky Anderson's Detroit Tigers, a team that had won 104 games during the regular season.  Although the Tigers won the Series in five games, both Williams and Anderson joined Dark, Joe McCarthy, and Yogi Berra as managers who had won pennants in both major leagues (Tony La Russa joined this group in 2004, Jim Leyland followed suit in 2006, followed by Joe Maddon in 2016 and Dusty Baker in 2021).

The Padres fell to third in 1985, and Williams was let go as manager just before 1986 spring training.  His record with the Padres was 337–311 over four seasons. As of 2011, he was the only manager in the team's history without a losing season. His difficulties with the Padres stemmed from a power struggle with team president Ballard Smith and general manager Jack McKeon.  Williams was a hire of team owner (and McDonald's restaurant magnate) Ray Kroc, whose health was failing.  McKeon and Smith (who also happened to be Kroc's son-in-law) were posturing to buy the team and viewed Williams as a threat to their plans.  With his San Diego tenure at an end, it appeared that Williams' managerial career was finished.

Final seasons in uniform
When another perennial loser, the Seattle Mariners, lost 19 of their first 28 games in 1986 under Chuck Cottier, Williams came back to the American League West on May 6 for the first time in almost a decade. The Mariners showed some life that season and almost reached .500 the following season. However, Williams' autocratic managing style no longer resonated with the new generation of ballplayers. He tried to play injury-plagued Gorman Thomas in the outfield, but was rebuked by the Mariners' front office because of Thomas' medical history, namely his rotator cuff.  Also, Williams had trouble relating to the devoutly religious Mariners' players, namely Alvin Davis.  Williams was fired on June 8, 1988 with Seattle 23–33 and in sixth place.  It would be his last major-league managing job. Williams' career won-loss totals were 1,571 wins and 1,451 losses over 21 seasons.

In 1989, Williams was named manager of the West Palm Beach Tropics of the Senior Professional Baseball Association, a league featuring mostly former major league players 35 years of age and older. The Tropics went 52–20 in the regular season and ran away with the Southern Division title. Despite their regular season dominance, the Tropics lost 12–4 to the St. Petersburg Pelicans in the league's championship game. The Tropics folded at the end of the season, and the rest of the league folded a year later.

He remained in the game, however, as a special consultant to George Steinbrenner and the New York Yankees. In 1990, Williams published his autobiography, No More Mister Nice Guy. His acrimonious departure in 1969 distanced Williams from the Red Sox for the remainder of the Yawkey ownership period (through 2001), but after the change in ownership and management that followed, he was selected to the Boston Red Sox Hall of Fame in 2006.

Williams' number was retired by the Fort Worth Cats.  The Cats were a popular minor league team in Fort Worth and Williams played there during 1948, 1949 and 1950, while he was working his way through the Dodgers' system. Moreover, Williams—in his Hall off Fame speech—cited Bobby Bragan, his Fort Worth manager, as a significant influence on his own career.  After the Texas League Cats finally disbanded in 1964, they returned as an independent league team in 2001.  These "New" Cats retired Williams' number.

Hall of Fame induction
Williams was elected to the Baseball Hall of Fame by the Veterans Committee in December 2007, and was inducted on July 27, 2008. He was inducted into the San Diego Padres Hall of Fame in 2009.

Managerial record

Personal life
Williams was an extra in the 1950 movie The Jackie Robinson Story. Before Williams became a major league manager in 1967, he successfully appeared on the television quiz shows Match Game and the original Hollywood Squares. According to Peter Marshall's Backstage with the Original Hollywood Squares, Williams won $50,000 as a contestant on the latter show.

His son, Rick Williams, a former minor league pitcher and major league pitching coach, became a professional scout for the Atlanta Braves. 

Williams died of a ruptured aortic aneurysm at a hospital near his home in Henderson, Nevada, on July 7, 2011.

Arrest
In January 2000, Williams pleaded no contest to indecent exposure charges in Florida. The complaint against him alleged that he was "walking naked and masturbating" on the balcony outside his hotel room. Williams subsequently stated that he was not aware of the details of the complaint when he pleaded no contest, and that although he was standing naked at the balcony door, he was not on the balcony and was not masturbating.

This occurred just weeks before Baseball Hall of Fame balloting by the Veterans Committee. Williams' arrest appeared to impact consideration by the committee, and he would not be inducted to the Baseball Hall of Fame until 2008. "What happened to me down in Fort Myers when I was arrested evidently hurt me quite a bit", Williams told The New York Times.

See also
 List of Major League Baseball managers by wins

References

Further reading
Cooper, Steve, Red Sox Diehard, 1967 season retrospective. Boston: Dunfey Publishing Co., 1987.
Stout, Glenn and Johnson, Richard A., Red Sox Century.  Boston and New York: Houghton-Mifflin Co., 2000.
Williams, Dick, and Plaschke, Bill, No More Mr. Nice Guy: A Life of Hardball. San Diego: Harcourt, Brace & Jovanovitch, 1990.

External links

 Dick Williams at SABR (Baseball BioProject)
Dick Williams at Baseball Biography

1929 births
2011 deaths
American expatriate baseball people in Canada
American expatriate baseball players in Canada
Baltimore Orioles players
Baseball players from Pasadena, California
Baseball players from St. Louis
Boston Red Sox managers
Boston Red Sox players
Brooklyn Dodgers players
California Angels managers
Cleveland Indians players
Deaths from aortic aneurysm
Fort Worth Cats players
Kansas City Athletics players
Major League Baseball left fielders
Major League Baseball third base coaches
Montreal Expos coaches
Montreal Expos managers
Montreal Royals players
National Baseball Hall of Fame inductees
New York Yankees scouts
Oakland Athletics managers
St. Paul Saints (AA) players
San Diego Padres managers
San Diego Padres scouts
Santa Barbara Dodgers players
Seattle Mariners managers
Toronto Maple Leafs (International League) managers
World Series-winning managers
Pasadena High School (California) alumni